Raja Ganesha was a Hindu Brahmin zamindar ruler of Bengal, who took advantage of the weakness of the first Ilyas Shahi dynasty and seized power in Bengal. Contemporary historians of the medieval period considered him as an usurper. The Ganesha dynasty founded by him ruled over Bengal from 1415−1435. His name mentioned in the coins of his son, sultan Jalaluddin Muhammad Shah as Kans Jha or Kans Shah. The Indo-Persian historians mentioned his name as Raja Kans or Kansi. A number of modern scholars identified him with Danujamardanadeva, but this identification is not universally accepted.

Early life
According to the Riaz-us-Salatin (a chronicle written in 1788), Raja Ganesha was a landlord of Bhaturia and according to Francis Buchanan Hamilton he was the Hakim (Governor) of Dinajpur in the northern Bengal. In a contemporary letter, he was described as a member of a landholder family of 400 years' standing. Later, he became an officer of the Ilyas Shahi dynasty rulers in Pandua. According to a very late authority, the Riaz-us-Salatin, he killed Sultan Ghiyasuddin Azam Shah (reigned 1390–1410), but the earlier authorities like Firishta and Nizam-ud-Din Ahmad do not refer to any such event and probably he died a natural death. Ghiyas-ud-Din Azam Shah was succeeded by his son Saifuddin Hamza Shah (reigned 1410–12) and the latter by Shihabuddin Bayazid Shah (reigned 1413–14). Firishta says that he became very powerful during the rule of Shihabuddin Bayazid Shah. While the earlier authorities like Firishta and Nizam-ud-Din say that Ganesha ascended to the throne after the death of Shihabuddin but again the Riaz-us-Salatin says that he killed Shihabuddin and seized the throne. Shihabuddin was succeeded by his son Ala-ud-din Firuz Shah (reigned 1414–15) but he was soon deposed by Raja Ganesha.

Reign
According to Firishta, The reign of Raja Ganesha was marked by his conciliatory policies toward the Muslims in Pandua. He mentioned that, "although Raja Ganesha was not a Muslim, he mixed freely with them and had so much love for them that some Muslims, witnessing to his faith in Islam, wanted to bury him in the Islamic manner." But according to the Riaz, soon after he took over the power in Pandua, he oppressed the Muslims of Bengal and slew a number of them. Thereupon, a Muslim Chishti Shaikh Nur Qutb Alam wrote a letter to the Jaunpur Sultan, Ibrahim Shah Sharqi, with an appeal to invade Bengal and overthrow Raja Ganesha. Purport of this letter is found in a letter written by Ashraf Jahangir Simnani, a Sufi shaikh of Jaunpur. According to a tradition, recorded by Mulla Taqyya, a courtier of Akbar and Jahangir, Ibrahim Shah, while proceeding to overthrow Raja Ganesha, was opposed by Sivasimha, the ruler of Oiniwar Dynasty Mithila. Mulla Taqyya gives the date of this event as 805 AH (1402-3), which is obviously wrong but there may be some truth in his statement about the alliance of Sivasimha with Raja Ganesha.

According to the narrative given in the unreliable Riaz, when Ibrahim Shah reached Bengal with his army, Ganesha defeated Shaikh Nur Qutb Alam . But many independent sources confirm that Ibrahim Shah was thoroughly defeated by Raja Ganesh, such as Chinese memoirs of that time, Arakan and Burmese histories as well as the ambassador of the Timurid ruler of Afghanistan.

The earlier accounts of the invasion of Ibrahim Shah Sharqi are different from the account given in the Riaz. A Chinese source mentioned that a kingdom to the west of Bengal had indeed invaded, but desisted when placated with gold and money. Abd-ur Razzaq Samarqandi, in his Maṭla'-us-Sadain wa Majma'-ul-Bahrain mentioned that in 1442, a diplomat in the service of Shah Rukh, the Timurid ruler of Herat (reigned 1405–47), wrote that his master had intervened in the Bengal-Jaunpur crisis at the request of the sultan of Bengal, "directing the ruler of Jaunpur to abstain from attacking the King of Bengal, or to take the consequences upon himself. To which intimidation the ruler of Jaunpur was obedient, and resisted from his attacks upon Bengal". A contemporary Arakanese tradition recorded that the army of Raja Ganesha, then firmly in control of Pandua, had defeated Ibrahim in battle. According to this tradition, one of the rulers of Arakan, Suleiman Shah who had been given refuge in Pandua after having been defeated by a Burman monarch in 1406, gave Raja Ganesha the military advice that enabled his army to defeat Ibrahim.

Identification with Danujamardanadeva

In 1922, a modern scholar, Nalini Kanta Bhattasali assumed in his Coins and Chronology of the Early Independent Sultans of Bengal, that, Danujamardanadeva, who issued silver coins in Saka era 1339-40 (1416–18) from Suvarnagrama, Pandunagara and Chatigrama with the Sanskrit legend, Shri Chandi Charana Parayana (devoted to the feet of Goddess Chandi) in Bengali script on the reverse, is actually a title of Raja Ganesha. He also assumed that Mahendradeva was the title assumed by the son of Raja Ganesha after his reconversion to Hinduism and before his second conversion to Islam. Historian Jadunath Sarkar dismisses this view, saying the Muslim accounts were biased; he favours the identification of Raja Ganesha with Danujamardanadeva believe that after the death of Raja Ganesha, the Hindu party in the court raised his second son to the throne under the title Mahendradeva, who was soon ousted by his elder brother Jalal-ud-Din. But Ahmad Hasan Dani regarded Danujamardanadeva and Mahendradeva as the local chiefs in East and South Bengal who asserted independence during troubles caused by the capture of power by Raja Ganesha and the invasions of Ibrahim Shah Sharqi. He, on the basis of the testimony of later oral and literary sources, identified Danujamardanadeva and Mahendradeva as the descendants of the Deva dynasty kings of Chandradvipa (the present-day Barisal district). Another modern scholar, Richard Eaton supported his view and identified the mint town Pandunagara with Chhota Pandua in the present-day Hooghly district. However, Vaishnava tradition of Bengal too hold Raja Ganesh as taking the title upon accession to throne.

Dinajpur Raj

According to a tradition, Dinajpur derived its name from Raja Dinaj or Dinaraj who founded the Dinajpur Raj (the estate of Dinajpur). But according to another tradition, Raja Ganesha was the real founder of this estate. In the late 17th century Srimanta Dutta Chaudhury (s/o Harish Chandra) from Andul Dutta Chaudhury Family became the zamindar of Dinajpur. After him, his sister's son Sukhdev Ghosh inherited his property as Srimanta's son had a premature death. Sukhdev's son Prannath Ray began construction of the Kantanagar Nava-Ratna Temple, presently known as the Kantajew Temple. The main blocks and the enclosing moats of the Rajbari (palace) were most probably constructed by Prannath and his adopted son Ramnath in the 18th century. The two-storied main palace was seriously damaged by an earthquake in 1897 and rebuilt later by Girijanath Ray.

See also 
 List of rulers of Bengal
 History of Bengal
 History of West Bengal
 History of India

References

Rulers of Bengal
Hindu monarchs
Bengali Hindus
15th-century Indian monarchs
People from Thakurgaon District